Guðjónsson or Gudjonsson is a surname of Icelandic origin, meaning son of Guðjón. In Icelandic names, the name is not strictly a surname, but a patronymic.

Notable people with the name include:

 Bjarni Guðjónsson (born 1979), Icelandic footballer
 Eyþór Guðjónsson (born 1968), Icelandic actor
 Gísli Guðjónsson (born 1947), Icelandic forensic psychologist
 Guðjón Már Guðjónsson (born 1972), Icelandic entrepreneur and businessman
 Gudmundur Orn Gudjonsson (born 1982), Icelandic archer
 Heimir Guðjónsson (footballer, born 1937), Icelandic footballer
 Heimir Guðjónsson (footballer, born 1969), Icelandic footballer
 Joey Guðjónsson (born 1980), Icelandic footballer
 Þórður Guðjónsson (born 1973), Icelandic footballer
 Þorsteinn Guðjónsson (born 1969), Icelandic footballer
 Snorri Guðjónsson (born 1981), Icelandic handball player

See also
 Gudjonsson suggestibility scale, a test to measure a person's susceptibility to coercive interrogation

Icelandic-language surnames